Nizamuddin Shamzai (12 July 1952 – 30 May 2004) was a pro-Taliban Pakistani Sunni Islamic scholar and the senior professor of hadith at the Jamia Uloom-ul-Islamia. He was considered "one of the most important Deobandi figures in Pakistan" and the mentor of Mullah Mohammed Omar. He issued religious edicts and travelled to elicit support for the Taliban.

Biography
Shamzai received his early education from his native town in Swat District. In the 1960s he migrated to Karachi to study at Jamia Darul Khair then he enrolled in Jamia Farooqia, Karachi. In the early 1990s, he got his Ph.D. degree from University of Sindh on Imam Bukhari's teachers.

Shamzai spent about 20 years teaching in Jamia Farooqia and joined Jamia Uloom-ul-Islamia where he succeeded to become Shaykh al-Hadith in 1997. He had close relations with Bin Laden and Mullah Umar and was member of the clerical delegation which went to Afghanistan for a discussion about handing over of Bin Laden in September 2001. He was however, a spiritual advisor of Mullah Umar and had travelled globally to elicit Islamic support for Taliban. He was Chief Mufti of Jamia Uloom-ul-Islamia and wrote books on jihad and issued fatwa's in favor of the Taliban.

Shamzai was shot dead on 31 March 2004 in Karachi. His funeral prayer was led by Abdur Razzaq Iskander, and was attended by Akram Khan Durrani, former Chief Minister of Khyber Pakhtunkhwa, and Fazal-ur-Rehman, President of Jamiat Ulema-e-Islam (F).
A September 2015 report from The Express Tribune says that alleged killer of Shamzai was arrested by Karachi police.

Views
Shamzai condemned the 9/11 attacks as he believed that such attacks take lives of innocent people. He convinced Mullah Umar to wage war against the United States of America and soon after 9/11, when the US invaded Afghanistan, he issued a fatwa permitting defensive jihad against US forces there.

Books
Apart from contributing a weekly religious column to a daily, he wrote in several Islamic journal as well many books, including Zahoor-i-Imam Mehdi and exegeses of Sahih Bukhari and Jami` at-Tirmidhi.

References

1952 births
2004 deaths
Pakistani Islamic religious leaders
Pakistani Sunni Muslim scholars of Islam
Pashtun people
Muslim missionaries
People from Swat District
University of Sindh alumni
Deobandis
Jamia Farooqia alumni
People from Karachi
Assassinated Pakistani Islamic scholars